Survivor is the second solo album by The Guess Who and Bachman–Turner Overdrive's guitarist and singer Randy Bachman, released in 1978 on Polydor. 
It is a concept album about the rock and roll stars who have come and gone.

A remastered reissue was released through Cherry Red Records on August 4, 2009.

Track listing
All songs written by Randy Bachman.

 "Just a Kid" – 3:21     
 "One Hand Clappin'" – 3:54     
 "Lost in the Shuffle" – 4:44    
 "Is the Night Too Cold for Dancin'" – 3:57   
 "You Moved Me" – 3:26
 "I am a Star" – 5:20     
 "Maybe Again" – 6:20    
 "Survivor" – 3:01

Personnel
Randy Bachman – vocals, guitar, autoharp, lap steel guitar
Burton Cummings – keyboards, background vocals
Jeff Porcaro – drums, percussion
Tom Scott – alto saxophone
Ian Gardiner - bass
Patti Brooks – background vocals
Becky Lopez – background vocals
Petsye Powell – background vocals

References

1978 albums
Randy Bachman albums
Polydor Records albums